Blenheim Hill is a mountain in Schoharie County, New York. It is located north-northeast of South Gilboa. Moore Hill is located south and Mine Hill is located southwest of Blenheim Hill.

References

Mountains of Schoharie County, New York
Mountains of New York (state)